The Foster Wikner Wicko was a 1930s British two-seat cabin monoplane built by the Foster Wikner Aircraft Company Limited at Southampton Airport, Hampshire.

History
Geoffrey Wikner was an Australian aircraft designer who moved to England in May 1934 and with his partners formed the Foster Wikner Aircraft Company Limited to build a low-cost two-seat high-wing monoplane. 
Low cost was helped by fitting a standard Ford V8 vehicle engine instead of a specialist aero-engine. The V.8 was fitted with a Pobjoy reduction gear and was known as the Wicko F power unit. The prototype aircraft was built at the J.F. Lusty's furniture factory at Bromley-by-Bow. The completed aircraft, designated the Wicko F.W.1 was taken by road to Stapleford Aerodrome, Essex and first flew in September 1936. Due to the  weight of the engine, the aircraft needed a long takeoff run and had a poor rate of climb.

The prototype was rebuilt as the Wicko F.W.2 with a more powerful but much lighter – 227 lb (103 kg) – air-cooled Cirrus Minor I engine. This resulted in a useful reduction in overall weight but the price increased from £425 to £650. The second and subsequent aircraft were built at Southampton Airport after the company moved in 1937.  The second machine was initially powered by a Cirrus Major motor and designated F.W.3, but later re-engined with a de Havilland Gipsy Major. The eight  machines subsequently completed used this engine as reflected by the name Wicko G.M.1. At the start of the Second World War production ceased and one airframe remained unfinished.

One aircraft exported to New Zealand was impressed into wartime service with the Royal New Zealand Air Force, crashing in 1942. Seven aircraft in the United Kingdom were impressed and another accepted directly into wartime service with the Royal Air Force, under the service name Warferry.

The celebrated woman aviator and Air Transport Auxiliary veteran Lettice Curtis bought a Wicko after WWII, in which she competed in several Daily Express Air Races.

One aircraft first registered as G-AFJB in 1938 was still operational with a permit to fly as of 2008. It is one of only two RAF machines to survive the war and has also recovered from a post-landing  fall from a cliff.

Variants
Wicko F.W.1prototype with an 85 hp Wicko F modified Ford V8 engine
Wicko F.W.2prototype re-engined with a 90 hp Blackburn Cirrus Minor I
Wicko F.W.3fitted with a 150 hp Blackburn Cirrus Major engine
Wicko G.M.1production version with a 130 hp de Havilland Gipsy Major engine
WarferryWicko G.M.1. in RAF service

Operators

Royal New Zealand Air Force

Royal Air Force
No. 24 Squadron RAF

Specifications (Wicko G.M.1)

See also

References

Notes

Bibliography

Grey, C.G. and Bridgman, L.  Jane's All the World's Aircraft 1938. (1972). Newton Abbot: David & Charles.

Further reading
Ord-Hume, Arthur; "Wikner and his Wicko", Aeroplane, July 2022, pp.98-105

1930s British civil utility aircraft
Wicko
Single-engined tractor aircraft
High-wing aircraft
Aircraft first flown in 1936